X-Faktor is a Hungarian television music competition to find new singing talent. Kiss Ramona presented her second series of X-Faktor. The eighth series aired on RTL Klub in 2018. ByeAlex, Laci Gáspár, Peti Puskás, and Gigi Radics remained in the jury in the 8th season. USNK won the competition and became the second group to win and also for the first time on the show that the final two were from the groups category.

Auditions
Open auditions took place in Budapest on 16 February 2018. The judges' auditions started on June in Budapest.

Judges' houses
This year there were no guest speakers, but every mentor would hear the performances of the four categories, then the mentor of that category would automatically bring two contestants to the live broadcasts and the remaining contestants would be assigned to the other three mentors who would select the third lead.

The thirteen eliminated acts were:
Boys: Krisztofer László Balogh, Barnabás Erdélyi, Krisztián Váradi
Girls: Szofi Ádám, Rita Csányi, Dominika Király, Dominika Tasi
Over 25s: Ervin Kárász, Apolka Nagy, Patrik Zdroba
Groups: The Gentleman Band, Helo Zep!, What's Upci

Contestants
Key:
 – Winner
 – Runner-Up
 – Third Place
 – Withdrawn

At the X-Factor press conference on November 14, Krisztián Nagy announced that he was withdrawing from the competition.

Results summary 

In the eighth season, new rules were introduced, four chairs were placed in the studio, which they can sit for, the mentors want to put forward to the next week, the seats on the chair may change during the show. Based on viewers' votes, another four contestants would be able to enter the next live show.
{|
|-
| – mentored by Laci Gáspár (Girls)
|| – Danger zone; Safe
|-
| – mentored by Peti Puskás (Boys)
| – Safe
|-
| – mentored by ByeAlex (Groups)
| – Eliminated by SMS vote
|-
| – mentored by Gigi Radics (Over 25s)
|}

Live Shows

Week 1 (17 November)
 Celebrity performer: AK 26 ("Blöff")
 Group performance: "Rise"

Week 2 (24 November)
 Celebrity performer: Follow the Flow ("Anyám mondta")

Week 3 (1 December)
 Celebrity performer: Róbert Szikora & R-GO ("Ballag a katona"/"Szeretlek is meg nem is")

Week 4 (8 December)
 Celebrity performer: Ofenbach ("Katchi"/"Paradise")

Week 5 Final (15 December)

Ratings
{| class="wikitable sortable" style="text-align:center"
|-
! scope="col" | Episode
! scope="col" | Air date
! scope="col" | Official rating<small>(millions)
! scope="col" | Weekly rank
|-
! scope="row" | Auditions 1
|  || 1.19 || 1
|-
! scope="row" | Auditions 2
|  || 1.29 || 1
|-
! scope="row" | Auditions 3
|  || 1.32 || 1
|-
! scope="row" | Auditions 4
|  || 1.35 || 1
|-
! scope="row" | Bootcamp 
|  || 1.18 || 1
|-
! scope="row" | Six-chair challenge
|  || 1.02 || 2
|-
! scope="row" | Judges' houses 1
|  || 1.17 || 1
|-
! scope="row" | Judges' houses 2
|  || 0.89 || 2
|-
! scope="row" | Live show 1
|  || 1.01 || 1
|-
! scope="row" | Live show 2
|  || 0.97 || 2
|-
! scope="row" | Live show 3
|  || 0.86 || 4
|-
! scope="row" | Live show 4
|  || 1.01 || 1
|-
! scope="row" | Final
|  || 0.90 || 2
|-

Hungary 08
2018 Hungarian television seasons